Mount Churchill is a mountain summit located in British Columbia, Canada.

Description 
Mount Churchill is a 1,996-meter-elevation (6,549-foot) peak situated 100 kilometers (60 miles) northwest of Vancouver, in the Sunshine Coast region, and is part of the Coast Mountains. Precipitation runoff from Mount Churchill drains to Jervis Inlet via Glacial Creek and High Creek. Mount Churchill is more notable for its steep rise than for its absolute elevation. Topographic relief is significant as the summit rises 1,996 meters (6,549 feet) above tidewater of Jervis Inlet in five kilometers (3.1 miles).

Etymology

The mountain was named in 1860 by Sir George Henry Richards, probably after Francis Spencer, 1st Baron Churchill (1779–1845), the youngest son of George Spencer, 4th Duke of Marlborough. The mountain's toponym was officially adopted March 31, 1924, by the Geographical Names Board of Canada.

Climate 
Based on the Köppen climate classification, Mount Churchill is located in the marine west coast climate zone of western North America. Most weather fronts originate in the Pacific Ocean, and travel east toward the Coast Mountains where they are forced upward by the range (Orographic lift), causing them to drop their moisture in the form of rain or snowfall. As a result, the Coast Mountains experience high precipitation, especially during the winter months in the form of snowfall. Temperatures in winter can drop below −20 °C with wind chill factors below −30 °C.

See also 
 Geography of British Columbia

Gallery

References

External links
 Mount Churchill: weather forecast

One-thousanders of British Columbia
Coast Mountains
Sunshine Coast (British Columbia)